Isabelle Demongeot and Nathalie Tauziat were the defending champions but did not compete that year.

Alexia Dechaume and Emmanuelle Derly won in the final 6–0, 6–2 against Louise Field and Nathalie Herreman.

Seeds
Champion seeds are indicated in bold text while text in italics indicates the round in which those seeds were eliminated.

 Louise Field /  Nathalie Herreman (final)
 Alexia Dechaume /  Emmanuelle Derly (champions)
 Linda Ferrando /  Laura Garrone (first round)
 Frédérique Martin /  Virginie Paquet (quarterfinals)

Draw

References
 1988 Open Clarins Doubles Draw

Clarins Open
1988 WTA Tour
1988 in French tennis